David Reubeni (1490–1535/1541?) was a Jewish political activist, described by the Shengold Jewish Encyclopedia as "half-mystic, half-adventurer." Although some scholars are reluctant to believe his claims to nobility, citing suspicions of fraud behind such claims (in spite of Reubeni's unrelenting efforts to make an alliance between Christians and Jews against Muslims by the intermediation of the young king, John (João) of Portugal), in November of 1525 he was nevertheless given an audience with the king, accompanied with a letter of recommendation from Pope Clement VII, and had always insisted that he was the son of a deceased monarch (King Suleiman of Ḥabor), and that he was the Minister of that kingdom's War Department, now governed by his elder brother, King Joseph of Ḥabor. According to Reubeni's own story this kingdom had 300,000 "Israelite" subjects. The king of Portugal, impressed by the idea, had initially agreed to supply Reubeni with Portuguese arms, but after five months, Reubeni fell into ill-repute with the king of Portugal, who perhaps distrusted his motives, and was asked by the king to leave his kingdom.

Biography

Origin 
The mysteries of Reubeni's origins are manifold, and have not been solved to this day. While Gedaliah ibn Yahya speaks of him as being "a man of dark complexion, like a Negro, and of low stature," his place of origin remains a mystery. Ibn Yahya elaborates, furthermore, that when David Reubeni visited Portugal, he stood in need of interpreters who escorted him in his journey, since he was only familiar with the Hebrew and Arabic languages.

Reubeni stated that he was born around 1490 in a place referred to variously as Ḥabor or Khaybar, which was subsequently identified with a place of a similar name  in central Arabia. He related that he had been sent by his brother, King Joseph, who ruled the kingdom with seventy elders, who was seeking alliances against the Turks conquering the area for its great wealth.

Another version is that his true origin was at a port called Cranganore, along the Malabar Coast of India, where a large and well-organized Jewish community had lived for many centuries.

Yet another version connects his origin with Afghanistan. Daoud Roubani is the name of a folk hero of the Pushtun tribes, and the similarity of the names is striking. The evidence was found by Prof. Walter Fischel, who published (<https://www.jstor.org/stable/597986>) an overview of all Judeo-Persian writing from ancient tombstones in Afghanistan, found all over the country, suggesting a Persian-Jewish merchant community, centered  in the lost medieval capital of Afghanistan, Firozkoh. But we know little beyond the fact of Jewish presence in Afghanistan.

Mission to Rome 
David Reubeni had envisioned a grand alliance between three Christian kings and one Jewish kingdom: King Charles V of the Holy Roman Empire, the King of France, Prester John – the western alias given to the Emperor of Ethiopia, and the Jewish kingdom of Khaibar which was then governed by Reubeni's brother. The broader aim of this alliance was meant to provide the necessary force of men in arms to expel the Ottoman Turks from the Land of Israel, and to facilitate what Reubeni believed was the imminent redemption of the oppressed nation of Israel. To achieve this objective, Reubeni needed to enlist the help of Pope Clement VII, and, therefore, he set out for Rome. In Rome, with the help of a Jewish friend, he laid out his detailed plans before the Pope, who had said to him that he could not personally get involved in helping to build such a coalition, but  nevertheless referred David Reubeni to John (João), the king of Portugal, who was directly related to King Charles by virtue of his marriage with his sister. Acquiescing, David Reubeni then set sail from Italy for Portugal, accompanied with a brief and letters of recommendation from the Pope to help facilitate his errand.

Eventually, Reubeni was given an audience before the king of Portugal. The king, impressed by the idea, had initially agreed to supply Reubeni with Portuguese arms, but after five months, Reubeni fell into ill-repute with the king of Portugal, who perhaps distrusted his motives, and was asked by the king to leave his kingdom.

Oriental travels 
He left Khaibar on December 8, 1522, travelled ten days' journey until he reached the port of Jedda, crossed the Red Sea and disembarked from his boat in the city of Suakim in the country of the blacks. He then joined a camel caravan which took him northbound, following the Nile River along the Nubian desert in northern Sudan, during which time he had disguised his identity by dressing as a Muslim and claiming to be a descendant of Muhammad.  This was done out of a concern for his own safety while travelling in a predominately Muslim country. He eventually reached Cairo (where his Jewish host was reluctant to receive him in his house because of his Muslim appearance), Gaza, Hebron (where he visited the tomb of the Patriarchs) and Jerusalem. When he spoke to audiences of Jews, he told of large Jewish kingdoms in the east, possibly referring to the Jewish community at Cochin or Yemen.  The Portuguese had just conquered Goa.

Reubeni traveled in the Ottoman Empire in the spring of 1523 and to Venice by way of Alexandria in February 1524.

European travels 
In Venice he reported to Clement VII, claiming to represent a mission from the Jews of the east.  He attracted funding from a Jewish painter named Mose, and Felice, a Jewish merchant for travel to Rome.  The same month Reubeni entered the city while riding a white horse.

Reubeni obtained an audience with Cardinal Giles of Viterbo and Pope Clement VII. To the latter he told a tale of a Jewish kingdom ruled over by his brother Joseph Reubeni in Arabia, where the sons of Moses dwelt near the Sambation River. He brought letters from Portuguese captains confirming his statements.  The Portuguese minister, Miguel da Silva, reported to his court that Reubeni might be useful in obtaining allies.  The Portuguese were competing against Selim I, who had seized Egypt in 1521 and diverted the valuable spice trade.

Jewish people raised money privately to give to Reubeni for his travel to Almeirim, the residence of King John III of Portugal, which he reached in November 1525. At first the king promised him a force of eight ships and 4,000 cannon.  Engaged in persecuting suspected marranos, the king found it difficult to enter into an alliance with a Jew.  While they were negotiating, the king refrained from interfering with conversos.

Reubeni's striking appearance–a swarthy dwarf in Oriental costume–and messianic claims attracted the attention of Diego Pires, a converso youth of noble birth, who, through the good agencies of Reubeni, had succeeded in returning to his Jewish roots and had taken the name of Solomon Molcho. Jewish ambassadors from the Barbary States visited Reubeni at the Portuguese court.  Some conversos were so excited by this activity that they rose in arms near Badajoz, where they freed a converso woman from the Inquisition.  Portuguese  authorities became worried about Reubeni's mission and the dangers of popular unrest.

Reubeni then went to Avignon to take his cause to the papal court, and afterward to Milan.  There he again met Molcho, who had traveled to the East and made messianic claims. In Milan the two adventurers quarreled. Reubeni went to Venice, where the Senate appointed a commission to review his plans for obtaining assistance from the Jews in the East.

Arrest and death 
Reubeni was warned to leave Venice. Joining once more with Solomon Molcho, he traveled with streaming banner to Bologna and Ratisbon (Regensburg) to meet the Emperor Charles V.

Reubeni offered Charles V the alliance of Jews of the East against the Ottoman Empire. In Ratisbon, Reubeni and Molcho met Josel of Rosheim, who warned them against arousing the suspicions of the emperor.  Josel was worried about raising issues of the Jews in the empire.  When Reubeni and Molcho persisted, officials put them in chains and took them to the emperor in Mantua.

There both Molcho and Reubeni were examined by inquisitors.  The former was condemned to burning at the stake in 1530, during the reign of Emperor Charles V (Caesar Carlo).  Reubeni was taken to Spain and assigned to the Inquisition at Llerena. As late as 1535 he was still confined in a prison there. Nothing more was heard of him. He probably died there, as  Herculano reported that "a Jew who came from India (sic) to Portugal" was burned at an auto da fé at Évora in 1541. Another source said Reubeni died in Llerena, Spain, after 1535.

Reubeni's diary is held by the Bodleian Library, Oxford.  There was possibly a copy at the Jewish Seminary at Breslau, but this place was destroyed by the Nazis in 1938. Parts were published by Heinrich Grätz in the third edition of his Geschichte der Juden (vol. ix.), and the whole was published by Neubauer, in M. J. C., ii.

See also
Eldad ha-Dani
Jewish Messiah claimants

References
 Heinrich Grätz, Gesch. ix. 238, 250, 255, 533-548.
 
 https://web.archive.org/web/20080820075048/http://israelendtimes.com/blog/2007/12/02/david-reubeni-hero-and-paradigm-of-israel%e2%80%99s-striving.htm
 Moti Benmelech, "History, Politics, and Messianism: David Ha-Reuveni's Origin and Mission", AJS  Review, 35 (2011), pp. 35–60.

Bibliography
 Verskin, Alan. Diary of a Black Jewish Messiah: The Sixteenth-Century Journey of David Reubeni through Africa, the Middle East, and Europe. Stanford, CA : Stanford University Press, 2023. 

Jewish explorers
Jewish messiah claimants
People executed for heresy
1490 births
16th-century deaths
15th-century Jews
16th-century Jews